Laurel Fork is an unincorporated community in Carter County, Tennessee, United States.

Notes

Unincorporated communities in Carter County, Tennessee
Unincorporated communities in Tennessee